Afsaneh Naseri (born 1 January 1960) is an Iranian actress and radio narrator.

Early life 
Afsaneh Naseri was born in 1960 in Tehran, Pahlavi Iran.

Career 
In 1995, she took her son Siavash, who was 9 years old at the time, to sign an acting contract in a television series. It was suggested by one of the actors for her to play the role of mother.

Filmography excerpt
 The Morning of the Last Day (TV series) directed by Hossein Tabrizi
 The Accomplice (TV series) directed by Mohsen kiaei
 Standardized Patient directed by Saeed Aghakhani
 The Enigma of the Shah (TV series) directed by Mohammad Reza Varzi
 In Search of Peace (TV series) directed by Saeed Soltani
 Hasht Behesht (TV series) directed by Saeed Alemzadeh
 Thousands of eyes (TV series) directed by Kianoush Ayari
 Dreams land (TV series) directed by Masoud Abparvar
 Saint Mary directed by Shahriar Bahrani
 Tootia directed by Iraj Ghaderi
 Youthful days (TV series) directed by Shapoor Gharib

References

External links

Afsaneh Naseri at Filimo

Iranian film actresses
Living people
Iranian television actresses
Actresses from Tehran
1960 births